Tiraboschi is a surname. Notable people with the surname include:
 Arduino Tiraboschi (born 1951) Italian biathlete
 Girolamo Tiraboschi (1731 – 1794), Italian literary critic
 Michele Tiraboschi (born 1965) Professor of Labour Law 
 Roberto Tiraboschi (born 1958), Italian author

Italian-language surnames